Virpi Katriina Sarasvuo (née Kuitunen, born 20 May 1976) is a Finnish former cross-country skier who competed from 1995 to 2010. She won a bronze medal in the team sprint event (with Aino-Kaisa Saarinen) at the 2006 Winter Olympics in Turin and earned her best individual finish of fifth in the individual sprint event in those same games. Four years later in Vancouver, Kuitunen won another bronze, this time in the 4 × 5 km relay.

Kuitunen has eight medals at the FIS Nordic World Ski Championships with six golds (2001: 5 km + 5 km combined pursuit, 2007: Team sprint, with Riitta-Liisa Roponen, 30 km, & 4 × 5 km; 2009: Team sprint, 4 × 5 km),  one silver (2005: 30 km), one bronze (2007: Individual sprint). She also has thirty-four additional individual victories at various levels of various distances since 2000.

Kuitunen won the first ever Tour de Ski competition for women in 2006–07, winning over Norway's Marit Bjørgen by 1:17.5. She also won the overall 2006–07 Cross-Country Skiing World Cup, as well as the sprint World Cup the same season. In the season 2007–08 Kuitunen won the overall again.

Because of Kuitunen's successes in cross-country skiing in 2007, she was awarded Finnish Sportswoman of the Year. Kuitunen also won the Tour de Ski in 2008–09.

Virpi Kuitunen married Jari Sarasvuo on 16 July 2010.

Doping controversy
At the 2001 FIS Nordic World Ski Championships in Lahti, Kuitunen was disqualified when she tested positive for hydroxyethyl starch, a banned blood plasma expander. This forced her to relinquish her silver medal earned in the 4 × 5 km and serve a two-year suspension that would not end until the 2003 FIS Nordic World Ski Championships.

Cross-country skiing results
All results are sourced from the International Ski Federation (FIS).

Olympic Games
 2 medals – (2 bronze)

World Championships
 8 medals – (6 gold, 1 silver, 1 bronze)

a.  Cancelled due to extremely cold weather.

World Cup

Season titles
 5 titles – (2 overall, 2 distance, 1 sprint)

Season standings

Individual podiums
 27 victories – (21 , 6 )
 52 podiums – (44 , 8 )

Team podiums

 4 victories – (4 ) 
 16 podiums – (13 , 3 )

Overall record

a.  Classification is made according to FIS classification.
b.  Includes individual and mass start races.
c.  Includes handicap start, pursuit and double pursuit races.
d.  Incomplete due to lack of appropriate sources prior to 2001.
e.   Did not finish the race (DNF).
f.  Withdrawn from 2009–10 Tour de Ski.

Note: Until 1999 World Championships, World Championship races are part of the World Cup. Hence results from 1999 World Championships races are included in the World Cup overall record.

References

Tour de Virpi report – Accessed 11 January 2007.

External links

1976 births
Living people
People from Kangasniemi
Cross-country skiers at the 2006 Winter Olympics
Cross-country skiers at the 2010 Winter Olympics
Doping cases in cross-country skiing
Finnish female cross-country skiers
Finnish sportspeople in doping cases
Olympic cross-country skiers of Finland
Olympic bronze medalists for Finland
Olympic medalists in cross-country skiing
FIS Nordic World Ski Championships medalists in cross-country skiing
FIS Cross-Country World Cup champions
Medalists at the 2010 Winter Olympics
Medalists at the 2006 Winter Olympics
Tour de Ski winners
Tour de Ski skiers
Sportspeople from South Savo